"Heartkiller" is a song by Finnish rock band HIM. It is the third track on their seventh studio album Screamworks: Love in Theory and Practice (2010), and was released in December 2009 as the second single from the album.

Music video 

The music video for "Heartkiller" premiered on the band's MySpace page on January 7, 2010, and appeared on their official website and YouTube page a day later.

Track listing

 U.S./Finland iTunes single

"Heartkiller" – 3:29

 Finnish CD and UK iTunes store

"Heartkiller" – 3:29
"Shatter Me with Hope (The Sword of Democles)" – 4:13
"Heartkiller (Moordeb VRS)" – 3:24

 Sweden and Germany CD single

"Heartkiller"
"Shatter Me With Hope (The Sword of Democles)"

Charts

References

HIM (Finnish band) songs
2009 songs
Songs written by Ville Valo
2010 singles